Woskowice Małe  (German Lorzendorf) is a village in the administrative district of Gmina Namysłów, within Namysłów County, Opole Voivodeship, in south-western Poland.

The village has an approximate population of 450.

References

Villages in Namysłów County